Natalia Karpenkova (born 1 February 1970) is a Belarusian trampoline gymnast. She competed in the women's trampoline event at the 2000 Summer Olympics and various Trampoline World Championships.

Career statistics

Trampoline World Championships

References 

1970 births
Living people
Belarusian female trampolinists
Gymnasts at the 2000 Summer Olympics
Olympic gymnasts of Belarus
European Games medalists in gymnastics
European Games gold medalists for Belarus
Medalists at the Trampoline Gymnastics World Championships
21st-century Belarusian women